Balarampur Union is a union parishad of Atwari Upazila, in Panchagarh District, Rangpur Division of Bangladesh. There are 10 villages and 10 mouzas in the union.

References

External links
 

Unions of Rangpur Division
Unions of Atwari Upazila
Unions of Panchagarh District